The United States government classification system is established under Executive Order 13526, the latest in a long series of executive orders on the topic beginning in 1951. Issued by President Barack Obama in 2009, Executive Order 13526 replaced earlier executive orders on the topic and modified the regulations codified to 32 C.F.R. 2001. It lays out the system of classification, declassification, and handling of national security information generated by the U.S. government and its employees and contractors, as well as information received from other governments.

The desired degree of secrecy about such information is known as its sensitivity. Sensitivity is based upon a calculation of the damage to national security that the release of the information would cause. The United States has three levels of classification: Confidential, Secret, and Top Secret. Each level of classification indicates an increasing degree of sensitivity. Thus, if one holds a Top Secret security clearance, one is allowed to handle information up to the level of Top Secret, including Secret and Confidential information. If one holds a Secret clearance, one may not then handle Top Secret information, but may handle Secret and Confidential classified information.

The United States does not have a British-style Official Secrets Act. Instead, several laws protect classified information, including the Espionage Act of 1917, the Atomic Energy Act of 1954 and the Intelligence Identities Protection Act of 1982.
A 2013 report to Congress noted that the relevant laws have been mostly used to prosecute foreign agents, or those passing classified information to them, and that leaks to the press have rarely been prosecuted. The legislative and executive branches of government, including US presidents, have frequently leaked classified information to journalists. Congress has repeatedly resisted or failed to pass a law that generally outlaws disclosing classified information. Most espionage law criminalizes only national defense information; only a jury can decide if a given document meets that criterion, and judges have repeatedly said that being "classified" does not necessarily make information become related to the "national defense". Furthermore, by law, information may not be classified merely because it would be embarrassing or to cover illegal activity; information may be classified only to protect national security objectives.

The United States over the past decades under the Obama and Clinton administrations has released classified information to foreign governments for diplomatic goodwill, known as declassification diplomacy. Examples include information on Augusto Pinochet to the government of Chile. In October 2015, US Secretary of State John Kerry provided Michelle Bachelet, Chile's president, with a pen drive containing hundreds of newly declassified documents.

A 2007 research report by Harvard history professor Peter Galison, published by the Federation of American Scientists, claimed that the classified universe in the US "is certainly not smaller and very probably is much larger than this unclassified one. ... [And] secrecy ... is a threat to democracy.

Reasons for such restrictions can include export controls, privacy regulations, court orders, and ongoing criminal investigations, as well as national security. Information that was never classified is sometimes referred to as "open source" by those who work in classified activities. Public Safety Sensitive (PSS) refers to information that is similar to Law Enforcement Sensitive but could be shared between the various public safety disciplines (Law Enforcement, Fire, and Emergency Medical Services).

Peter Louis Galison, a historian and Director in the History of Science department at Harvard University, claims that the U.S. Government produces more classified information than unclassified information.

Levels and categories of classification
The United States government classifies sensitive information according to the degree which the unauthorized disclosure would damage national security. The three primary levels of classification (from least to greatest) are Confidential, Secret, and Top Secret.

However, even Top Secret clearance does not allow one to access all information at, or below, Top Secret level. Access requires the clearance necessary for the sensitivity of the information, as well as a legitimate need to obtain the information. For example, all US military pilots are required to obtain at least a Secret clearance, but they may only access documents directly related to their orders.

To ensure that only those with a legitimate need to know can access information, classified information may have additional categorizations/markings and access controls that could prevent even someone with a sufficient level of clearance from seeing it. Examples of this include: Special Access Program (SAP), Sensitive Compartmented Information (SCI), Restricted Data (RD), and Alternative or Compensatory Control Measures (ACCM).

The classification system is governed by Executive Order rather than by law. An exception is information on nuclear weapons, materials and power, where levels of protection are specified in the Atomic Energy Act of 1954, see restricted data. Typically each president will issue a new executive order, either tightening classification or loosening it. The Clinton administration made a major change in the classification system by issuing an executive order that for the first time required all classified documents to be declassified after 25 years unless they were reviewed by the agency that created the information and determined to require continuing classification. Executive Order 13292, issued by President George W. Bush in 2003 relaxed some declassification requirements.

Primary levels

Confidential

This is the lowest classification level of information obtained by the government. It is defined as information that would "damage" national security if publicly disclosed, again, without the proper authorization.

Examples include information related to military strength and weapons.

During and before World War II, the U.S. had a category of classified information called Restricted, which was below confidential. The U.S. no longer has a Restricted classification, but many other countries and NATO documents do. The U.S. treats Restricted information it receives from other governments as Confidential. The U.S. does use the term restricted data in a completely different way to refer to nuclear secrets, as described below.

Secret

This is the second-highest classification. Information is classified Secret when its unauthorized disclosure would cause "serious damage" to national security. Most information that is classified is held at the secret sensitivity.

"Examples of serious damage include disruption of foreign relations significantly affecting the national security; significant impairment of a program or policy directly related to the national security; revelation of significant military plans or intelligence operations: compromise of significant military plans or intelligence operations; and compromise of significant scientific or technological developments relating to national security."

Top Secret

The highest security classification. "Top Secret shall be applied to information, the unauthorized disclosure of which reasonably could be expected to cause 'exceptionally grave damage' to the National Security that the original classification authority is able to identify or describe." As of 2019, around 1.25 million individuals have Top Secret clearance.

"Examples of exceptionally grave damage include armed hostilities against the United States or its allies; disruption of foreign relations vitally affecting the national security; the compromise of vital national defense plans or complex cryptology and communications intelligence systems; the revelation of sensitive intelligence operations, and the disclosure of scientific or technological developments vital to national security."

Additional proscribed categories
Top Secret is the highest level of classification. However some information is further categorized/marked by adding a code word so that only those who have been cleared for each code word can see it. A document marked SECRET (CODE WORD) could be viewed only by a person with a secret or top secret clearance and that specific code word clearance.

Special Access Program

Executive Order 13526, which forms the legal basis for the U.S. classification system, states that "information may be classified at one of the following three levels", with Top Secret as the highest level (Sec. 1.2). However, this executive order provides for special access programs that further restricted access to a small number of individuals and permit additional security measures (Sec. 4.3).
These practices can be compared with (and may have inspired) the concepts multilevel security and role-based access control. U.S. law also has special provisions protecting information related to cryptography (18 USC 798), nuclear weapons and atomic energy (see Controls on atomic-energy information) and the identity of covert intelligence agents (see Intelligence Identities Protection Act).

Sensitive Compartmented Information

Classified information concerning or derived from sensitive intelligence sources, methods, or analytical processes. All SCI must be handled within formal access control systems established by the Director of National Intelligence.

Restricted Data/Formerly Restricted Data
 

Restricted Data (RD) and Formerly Restricted Data (FRD) are classification markings that concern nuclear information. These are the only two classifications that are established by federal law, being defined by the Atomic Energy Act of 1954. Nuclear information is not automatically declassified after 25 years. Documents with nuclear information covered under the Atomic Energy Act will be marked with a classification level (confidential, secret or top secret) and a restricted data or formerly restricted data marking.

Nuclear information as specified in the act may inadvertently appear in unclassified documents and must be reclassified when discovered. Even documents created by private individuals have been seized for containing nuclear information and classified. Only the Department of Energy may declassify nuclear information.

Most RD and FRD (as well as most classified information in general) are classified at either the Confidential or Secret levels; however they require extra RD/FRD specific clearances in addition to the clearance level.

Unclassified
Unclassified is not technically a classification; this is the default and refers to information that can be released to individuals without a clearance. Information that is unclassified is sometimes restricted in its dissemination as Controlled Unclassified Information. For example, the law enforcement bulletins reported by the U.S. media when the United States Department of Homeland Security raised the U.S. terror threat level were usually classified as "U//LES", or "Unclassified – Law Enforcement Sensitive". This information is supposed to be released only to law enforcement agencies (sheriff, police, etc.), but, because the information is unclassified, it is sometimes released to the public as well.

Information that is unclassified but which the government does not believe should be subject to Freedom of Information Act requests is often classified as Controlled Unclassified Information (CUI). In addition to CUI classification, information can be categorized according to its availability to be distributed, e.g., Distribution D may only be released to approved Department of Defense and U.S. Department of Defense contractor personnel.

The statement of NOFORN (meaning "no foreign nationals") is applied to any information that may not be released to any non-U.S. citizen. NOFORN and distribution statements are often used in conjunction with classified information or alone on SBU information. Documents subject to export controls have a specific warning to that effect. Information which is "personally identifiable" is governed by the Privacy Act of 1974 and is also subject to strict controls regardless of its level of classification.

Finally, information at one level of classification may be "upgraded by aggregation" to a higher level. For example, a specific technical capability of a weapons system might be classified Secret, but the aggregation of all technical capabilities of the system into a single document could be deemed Top Secret.

Use of information restrictions outside the classification system is growing in the U.S. government. In September 2005 J. William Leonard, director of the U.S. National Archives Information Security Oversight Office, was quoted in the press as saying, "No one individual in government can identify all the controlled, unclassified [categories], let alone describe their rules."

Controlled Unclassified Information (CUI)

One of the 9/11 Commission findings was that "the government keeps too many secrets." To address this problem, the Commission recommended that '[t]he culture of agencies feeling they own the information they gathered at taxpayer expense must be replaced by a culture in which the agencies instead feel they have a duty ... to repay the taxpayers' investment by making that information available.'"

Due to over 100 designations in use by the U.S. government for unclassified information at the time, President George W. Bush issued a Presidential memorandum on May 9, 2008, in an attempt to consolidate the various designations in use into a new category known as Controlled Unclassified Information (CUI). The CUI categories and subcategories were hoped to serve as the exclusive designations for identifying unclassified information throughout the executive branch not covered by Executive Order 12958 or the Atomic Energy Act of 1954 (as amended, though there is CUI//SP-UCNI now) but still required safeguarding or dissemination controls, pursuant to and consistent with any applicable laws, regulations, and government-wide policies in place at the time. CUI would replace categories such as For Official Use Only (FOUO), Sensitive But Unclassified (SBU) and Law Enforcement Sensitive (LES).

The Presidential memorandum also designated the National Archives as responsible for overseeing and managing the implementation of the new CUI framework.

This memorandum has since been rescinded by Executive Order 13556 of November 4, 2010 and the guidelines previously outlined within the memo were expanded upon in a further attempt to improve the management of information across all federal agencies as well as establish a more standard, government-wide program regarding the controlled declassification designation process itself.

The U.S. Congress has attempted to take steps to resolve this, but did not succeed. The U.S. House of Representatives passed the Reducing Information Control Designations Act  on March 17, 2009. The bill was referred to the Senate Committee on Homeland Security and Governmental Affairs. Because no action was taken in committee and bills expire at the end of every Congress, there is currently no bill to solve unclassified designations.

For Official Use Only (FOUO)

Among U.S. government information, FOUO was primarily used by the U.S. Department of Defense as a handling instruction for Controlled Unclassified Information (CUI) which may be exempt from release under exemptions two to nine of the Freedom of Information Act (FOIA). It is one of the various sub-categorizations for strictly unclassified information which, on 24 February 2012, was officially consolidated as CUI.

Other departments continuing the use of this designation include the Department of Homeland Security.

Public Trust
According to the Department of Defense, Public Trust is a type of position, not clearance level, though General Services Administration refers to it as clearance level. Certain positions which require access to sensitive information, but not information which is classified, must obtain this designation through a background check. Public Trust Positions can either be moderate-risk or high-risk.

Proper procedure for classifying U.S. government documents
To be properly classified, a classification authority (an individual charged by the U.S. government with the right and responsibility to properly determine the level of classification and the reason for classification) must determine the appropriate classification level, as well as the reason information is to be classified. A determination must be made as to how and when the document will be declassified, and the document marked accordingly. Executive Order 13526 describes the reasons and requirements for information to be classified and declassified (Part 1). Individual agencies within the government develop guidelines for what information is classified and at what level.

The former decision is original classification. A great majority of classified documents are created by derivative classification. For example, if one piece of information, taken from a secret document, is put into a document along with 100 pages of unclassified information, the document, as a whole, will be secret. Proper rules stipulate that every paragraph will bear a classification marking of (U) for Unclassified, (C) for Confidential, (S) for Secret, and (TS) for Top Secret. Therefore, in this example, only one paragraph will have the (S) marking. If the page containing that paragraph is double-sided, the page should be marked SECRET on top and bottom of both sides.

A review of classification policies by the Office of the Director of National Intelligence aimed at developing a uniform classification policy and a single classification guide that could be used by the entire U.S. intelligence community found significant interagency differences that impaired cooperation and performance. The initial ODNI review, completed in January 2008, said in part, "The definitions of 'national security' and what constitutes 'intelligence'—and thus what must be classified—are unclear. ... Many interpretations exist concerning what constitutes harm or the degree of harm that might result from improper disclosure of the information, often leading to inconsistent or contradictory guidelines from different agencies. ... There appears to be no common understanding of classification levels among the classification guides reviewed by the team, nor any consistent guidance as to what constitutes 'damage,' 'serious damage,' or 'exceptionally grave damage' to national security. ... There is wide variance in application of classification levels."

The review recommended that original classification authorities should specify clearly the basis for classifying information, for example, whether the sensitivity derives from the actual content of the information, the source, the method by which it was analyzed, or the date or location of its acquisition. Current policy requires that the classifier be "able" to describe the basis for classification but not that he or she in fact do so.

Classification categories
Step 3 in the classification process is to assign a reason for the classification. Classification categories are marked by the number "1.4" followed by one or more letters (a) to (h):
 1.4(a) military plans, weapons systems, or operations;
 1.4(b) foreign government information;
 1.4(c) intelligence activities, sources, or methods, or cryptology;
 1.4(d) foreign relations or foreign activities of the United States, including confidential sources;
 1.4(e) scientific, technological or economic matters relating to national security; which includes defense against transnational terrorism;
 1.4(f) United States Government programs for safeguarding nuclear materials or facilities;
 1.4(g) vulnerabilities or capabilities of systems, installations, infrastructures, projects or plans, or protection services relating to the national security, which includes defense against transnational terrorism; and/or
 1.4(h) the development, production, or use of weapons of mass destruction.

Classifying non-government-generated information
The Invention Secrecy Act of 1951 allows the suppression of patents (for a limited time) for inventions that threaten national security.

Whether information related to nuclear weapons can constitutionally be "born secret" as provided for by the Atomic Energy Act of 1954 has not been tested in the courts.

Guantanamo Bay detention camp has used a "presumptive classification" system to describe the statements of Guantanamo Bay detainees as classified. When challenged by Ammar al-Baluchi in the Guantanamo military commission hearing the 9/11 case, the prosecution abandoned the practice. Presumptive classification continues in the cases involving the habeas corpus petitions of Guantanamo Bay detainees.

Protecting classified information

Facilities and handling
One of the reasons for classifying state secrets into sensitivity levels is to tailor the risk to the level of protection. The U.S. government specifies in some detail the procedures for protecting classified information. The rooms or buildings for holding and handling classified material must have a facility clearance at the same level as the most sensitive material to be handled. Good quality commercial physical security standards generally suffice for lower levels of classification. At the highest levels, people sometimes must work in rooms designed like bank vaults (see Sensitive Compartmented Information Facility – SCIF). The U.S. Congress has such facilities inside the Capitol Building, among other Congressional handling procedures for protecting confidentiality.

The U.S. General Services Administration sets standards for locks and containers used to store classified material. The most commonly-approved security containers resemble heavy-duty file cabinets with a combination lock in the middle of one drawer. In response to advances in methods to defeat mechanical combination locks, the U.S. government switched to electromechanical locks that limit the rate of attempts to unlock them. After a specific number of failed attempts, they will permanently lock, requiring a locksmith to reset them.

The most sensitive material requires two-person integrity, where two cleared individuals are responsible for the material at all times. Approved containers for such material have two separate combination locks, both of which must be opened to access the contents.

Marking
Classified U.S. government documents typically must be stamped with their classification on the cover and at the top and bottom of each page. Authors must mark each paragraph, title and caption in a document with the highest level of information it contains, usually by placing appropriate initials in parentheses at the beginning of the paragraph, title, or caption, for example (C), (S), (TS), (TS-SCI), etc., or (U) for unclassified.

Cover sheets

Commonly, one must affix a brightly colored cover sheet to the cover of each classified document to prevent unauthorized observation of classified material (shoulder surfing) and to remind users to lock up unattended documents.  The cover sheets warn viewers of the sensitive nature of the enclosed material, but are themselves are unclassified. Typical colors are blue for confidential, red for secret and orange for top secret.

Transmission
Restrictions dictate shipment methods for classified documents. Top Secret material must go by special courier, Secret material within the U.S. via registered mail, and Confidential material by certified mail. Electronic transmission of classified information largely requires the use of National Security Agency approved/certified "Type 1" cryptosystems using NSA's unpublished and classified Suite A algorithms. The classification of the Suite A algorithms categorizes the hardware that store them as a Controlled Cryptographic Item (CCI) under the International Traffic in Arms Regulations, or ITAR.

CCI equipment and keying material must be controlled and stored with heightened physical security, even when the device is not processing classified information or contains no cryptographic key. NSA is currently implementing what it calls Suite B, a group of commercial algorithms such as Advanced Encryption Standard (AES), Secure Hash Algorithm (SHA), Elliptic Curve Digital Signature Algorithm (ECDSA) and Elliptic curve Diffie–Hellman (ECDH). Suite B provides protection for data up to Top Secret on non-CCI devices, which is especially useful in high-risk environments or operations needed to prevent Suite A compromise. These less stringent hardware requirements stem from the device not having to "protect" classified Suite A algorithms.

Specialized computer operating systems known as trusted operating systems are available for processing classified information. These systems enforce the classification and labeling rules described above in software. Since 2005 they are not considered secure enough to allow uncleared users to share computers with classified activities. Thus, if one creates an unclassified document on a secret device, the resultant data is classified secret until it can be manually reviewed. Computer networks for sharing classified information are segregated by the highest sensitivity level they are allowed to transmit, for example, SIPRNet (Secret) and JWICS (Top Secret-SCI).

Destruction
The destruction of certain types of classified documents requires burning, shredding, pulping or pulverizing using approved procedures and must be witnessed and logged. Classified computer data presents special problems. See Data remanence.

Lifetime commitment
When a cleared individual leaves the job or employer for which they were granted access to classified information, they are formally debriefed from the program. Debriefing is an administrative process that accomplishes two main goals: it creates a formal record that the individual no longer has access to the classified information for that program; and it reminds the individual of their lifetime commitment to protect that information.

Typically, the individual is asked to sign another non-disclosure agreement (NDA), similar to that which they signed when initially briefed, and this document serves as the formal record. The debriefed individual does not lose their security clearance; they have only surrendered the need to know for information related to that particular job.

Classifications and clearances between U.S. government agencies

In the past, clearances did not necessarily transfer between various U.S. government agencies. For example, an individual cleared for Department of Defense Top Secret had to undergo another investigation before being granted a Department of Energy Q clearance. Agencies are now supposed to honor background investigations by other agencies if they are still current.

Because most security clearances only apply inside the agency where the holder works, if one needs to meet with another agency to discuss classified matters, it is possible and necessary to pass one's clearance to the other agency. For example, officials visiting at the White House from other government agencies would pass their clearances to the Executive Office of the President (EOP).

The Department of Energy security clearance required to access Top Secret Restricted Data, Formerly Restricted Data, and National Security Information, as well as Secret Restricted Data, is a Q clearance. The lower-level L clearance is sufficient for access to Secret Formerly Restricted Data and National Security Information, as well as Confidential Restricted Data and Formerly Restricted Data. In practice, access to Restricted Data is granted, on a need-to-know basis, to personnel with appropriate clearances. At one time, a person might hold both a TS and a Q clearance, but that duplication and cost is no longer required. For all practical purposes, Q is equivalent to Top Secret, and L is equivalent to Secret.

Contrary to popular lore, the Yankee White clearance given to personnel who work directly with the President is not a classification. Individuals having Yankee White clearances undergo extensive background investigations. The criteria include U.S. citizenship, unquestionable loyalty, and an absolute absence of any foreign influence over the individual, their family, or "persons to whom the individual is closely linked".

Also, they must not have traveled (save while in government employ and at the instructions of the United States) to countries that are considered to be unfriendly to the United States. Yankee White cleared personnel are granted access to any information for which they have a need to know, regardless of which organization classified it or at what level.

See also the Single Scope Background Investigation below, along with explicit compartmented access indoctrination. Some compartments, especially intelligence-related, may require a polygraph examination, although the reliability of the polygraph is controversial. The NSA uses the polygraph early in the clearance process while the CIA uses it at the end, which may suggest divergent opinions on the proper use of the polygraph.

Standard form 312
Standard Form 312 (SF 312) is a non-disclosure agreement required under Executive Order 13292 to be signed by employees of the U.S. Federal Government or one of its contractors when they are granted a security clearance for access to classified information. The form is issued by the Information Security Oversight Office of the National Archives and Records Administration and its title is "Classified Information Nondisclosure Agreement." SF 312 prohibits confirming or repeating classified information to unauthorized individuals, even if that information is already leaked. The SF 312 replaces the earlier forms SF 189 or the SF 189-A. Enforcement of SF-312 is limited to civil actions to enjoin disclosure or seek monetary damages and administrative sanctions, "including reprimand, suspension, demotion or removal, in addition to the likely loss of the security clearance."

Categories that are not classifications
Compartments also exist, that employ code words pertaining to specific projects and are used to more easily manage individual access requirements. Code words are not levels of classification themselves, but a person working on a project may have the code word for that project added to their file, and then will be given access to the relevant documents. Code words may also label the sources of various documents; for example, code words are used to indicate that a document may break the cover of intelligence operatives if its content becomes known. The WWII code word Ultra identified information found by decrypting German ciphers, such as the Enigma machine, and which—regardless of its own significance—might inform the Germans that Enigma was broken if they became aware that it was known.

Sensitive Compartmented Information (SCI) and Special Access Programs (SAP)
The terms "Sensitive Compartmented Information" (SCI) and "Special Access Program" (SAP) are widely misunderstood as classification levels or specific clearances.

In fact, the terms refer to methods of handling certain types of classified information that relate to specific national-security topics or programs (whose existence may not be publicly acknowledged) or the sensitive nature of which requires special handling, and thereby those accessing it require special approval to access it.

The paradigms for these two categories, SCI originating in the intelligence community and SAP in the Department of Defense, formalize 'Need to Know' and addresses two key logistical issues encountered in the day-to-day control of classified information:

Individuals with a legitimate need to know may not be able to function effectively without knowing certain facts about their work. However, granting all such individuals a blanket DoD clearance (often known as a "collateral" clearance) at the Top Secret level would be undesirable, not to mention prohibitively expensive.

The government may wish to limit certain types of sensitive information only to those who work directly on related programs, regardless of the collateral clearance they hold. Thus, even someone with a Top Secret clearance cannot gain access to its Confidential information unless it is specifically granted.

To be clear, "collateral" (formerly referred to as General Service or GENSER) simply means one lacks special access (e.g. SCI, SAP, COMSEC, NATO, etc.). Confidential, Secret, and Top Secret are all, by themselves, collateral clearance levels.

SAP and SCI are usually found at the Top Secret classification, but there is no prohibition of applying such segregation to Confidential and Secret information.

SAP and SCI implementation are roughly equivalent, and it is reasonable to discuss their implementation as one topic. For example, SAP material needs to be stored and used in a facility much like the SCIF described below.

Department of Energy information, especially the more sensitive SIGMA categories, may be treated as SAP or SCI.

Access to compartmented information

Personnel who require knowledge of SCI or SAP information fall into two general categories:
 Persons with a need to know
 Persons with actual access

Access to classified information is not authorized based on clearance status. Access is only permitted to individuals after determining they have a need to know. Need-to-know is a determination that an individual requires access to specific classified information in the performance of (or assist in the performance of) lawful and authorized government functions and duties.

To achieve selective separation of program information while still allowing full access to those working on the program, a separate compartment, identified by a unique codeword, is created for the information. This entails establishing communication channels, data storage, and work locations (SCIF—Sensitive Compartmented Information Facility), which are physically and logically separated not only from the unclassified world, but from general Department of Defense classified channels as well.

Thus established, all information generated within the compartment is classified according to the general rules above. However, to emphasize that the information is compartmented, all documents are marked with both the classification level and the codeword (and the caveat "Handle via <compartment name> Channels Only", or "Handle via <compartment names> Jointly" if the document contains material from multiple programs).

A person is granted access to a specific compartment after the individual has: (a) had a Single Scope Background Investigation similar to that required for a collateral Top Secret clearance; (b) been "read into" or briefed on the nature and sensitivity of the compartment; and (c) signed a non-disclosure agreement (NDA).

Access does not extend to any other compartment; i.e., there is no single "SCI clearance" analogous to DoD collateral Top Secret. The requirements for DCID 6/4 eligibility (a determination that an individual is eligible for access to SCI), subsumes the requirements for a TS collateral clearance. Being granted DCID 6/4 eligibility includes the simultaneous granting of a TS collateral clearance, as adjudicators are required to adjudicate to the highest level that the investigation (SSBI) supports.

Examples

Examples of such control systems and subsystems are:
 SCI – Sensitive Compartmented Information
 BYEMAN (BYE or B)
 COMINT or Special Intelligence (SI)
 Very Restricted Knowledge (VRK)
 Exceptionally Controlled Information (ECI), which was used to group compartments for highly sensitive information, but was deprecated as of 2011.
 GAMMA (SI-G)
 ENDSEAL (EL)
 HUMINT Control System (HCS)
 KLONDIKE (KDK)
 RESERVE (RSV)
 TALENT KEYHOLE (TK)
 SAP – Special Access Programs
 COPPER GREEN

Groups of compartmented information

There is no public reference to whether SCI is divided in the same manner, but news reports reflecting that only the Gang of Eight members of Congress are briefed on certain intelligence activities, it may be assumed that similar rules apply for SCI or for programs with overlapping SAP and SCI content.

The groups for Department of Defense SAPs are:

Acknowledged: appears as a line item as "classified project" or the equivalent in the federal budget, although details of its content are not revealed. The budget element will associate the SAP with a Department of Defense component organization, such as a Military Department (e.g. Department of the Navy), a Combatant Command (e.g. U.S. Special Operations Command) or a Defense Agency (e.g. Defense Information Systems Agency.)
Unacknowledged: no reference to such SAPs is found in the publicly published federal budget; its funding is hidden in a classified annex, often called the "black budget". The Congressional defense committees, however, are briefed on the specifics of such SAPs.
Waived: At the sole discretion of the Secretary of Defense, on a case-by-case basis in the interest of national security, there is no mention in the budget at all, and only the "Big 6" members of Congress: the Chairman and Ranking Minority Members of the armed services committees, the appropriations committees and the defense appropriations subcommittees; receive notification of such SAPs.

Examples of SCI topics are human intelligence, communications intelligence, and intelligence collected by satellites. One or more compartments may be created for each area, and each of these compartments may contain multiple subcompartments (e.g., a specific HUMINT operation), themselves with their own code names.

Specific compartmented programs will have their own specific rules. For example, it is standard that no person is allowed unaccompanied access to a nuclear weapon or to command-and-control systems for nuclear weapons. Personnel with nuclear-weapons access are under the Personnel Reliability Program.

Some highly sensitive SAP or SCI programs may also use the "no lone zone" method (that is, a physical location into which no one is allowed to enter unaccompanied) described for nuclear weapons.

Handling caveats
The United States also has a system of restrictive caveats that can be added to a document: these are constantly changing, but can include (in abbreviated form) a requirement that the document not be shared with a civilian contractor or not leave a specific room. These restrictions are not classifications in and of themselves; rather, they restrict the dissemination of information within those who have the appropriate clearance level and possibly the need to know the information. Remarks such as "EYES ONLY" and "DO NOT COPY" also limit the restriction. One violating these directives might be guilty of violating a lawful order or mishandling classified information.

For ease of use, caveats and abbreviations have been adopted that can be included in the summary classification marking (header/footer) to enable the restrictions to be identified at a glance. They are sometimes known as Dissemination Control Abbreviations.
 Some of these caveats are (or were):
CUI: Controlled Unclassified Information Replaces the labels For Official Use Only (FOUO), Sensitive But Unclassified (SBU), and Law Enforcement Sensitive (LES).
FOUO: For Official Use Only. Superseded by CUI and no longer in use with the exception of Department of Homeland Security documents. Used for documents or products which contain material which is exempt from release under the Freedom of Information Act.
NFIBONLY: National Foreign Intelligence Board Departments Only
NOFORN: Distribution to non-US citizens is prohibited, regardless of their clearance or access permissions (NO FOReign National access allowed).
NOCONTRACTOR: Distribution to contractor personnel (non-US-government employees) is prohibited, regardless of their clearance or access permissions.
ORCON: Originator controls dissemination and/or release of the document.
PROPIN: Caution—Proprietary Information Involved
REL<country code(s)>: Distribution to citizens of the countries listed is permitted, providing they have appropriate accesses and need to know. Example: "REL TO USA, AUS, CAN, GBR, NZL" indicates that the information may be shared with appropriate personnel from Australia, the United Kingdom, Canada, and New Zealand.
FVEY is the country code used as shorthand for the Five Eyes.
<nn>X<m>: Information is exempt from automatic declassification (after the statutory default of 25 years) for exemption reason <m>, and declassification review shall not be permitted for <nn> years (as determined by law or the Interagency Security Classification Appeals Panel). For the most part, the exemption reasoning and caveats are outlined in paragraphs (b)–(d) and (g)–(i) of Sec. 3.3 of Executive Order 13526, but paragraph (b) is typically the one being referenced as the exemption reason value <m>.
Example: "50X1" indicates the information must remain classified for 50 years, since it pertains to intelligence activities, sources, or methods (reason (1) of Section 3.3, paragraph (b)).
RESTRICTED: Distribution to non-US citizens or those holding an interim clearance is prohibited; certain other special handling procedures apply.
FISA: is used in FISC and probably in FISCR since at least 2017.

Classification level and caveats are typically separated by "//" in the summary classification marking. For example, the final summary marking of a document might be:

SECRET//<compartment name>//ORCON/NOFORN or
TOP SECRET//NOFORN/FISA

Controls on atomic-energy information
The Atomic Energy Act of 1954 sets requirements for protection of information about nuclear weapons and special nuclear materials. Such information is "classified from birth", unlike all other sensitive information, which must be classified by some authorized individual. However, authorized classifiers still must determine whether documents or material are classified or restricted.

The U.S. Department of Energy recognizes two types of Restricted Data:
 Restricted Data. Data concerning the design, manufacture, or utilization of atomic weapons; production of special nuclear material; or use of special nuclear material in the production of energy.
 Formerly Restricted Data. Classified information jointly determined by the DOE and the Department of Defense to be related primarily to the military utilization of atomic weapons and removed from the Restricted Data category.

Documents containing such information must be marked "RESTRICTED DATA" (RD) or "FORMERLY RESTRICTED DATA" (FRD) in addition to any other classification marking. Restricted Data and Formerly Restricted Data are further categorized as Top Secret, Secret, or Confidential.

SIGMA categories and Critical Nuclear Weapon Design Information
RESTRICTED DATA contains further compartments. The Department of Energy establishes a list of SIGMA Categories for more fine-grained control than RESTRICTED DATA.
Critical Nuclear Weapon Design Information (CNWDI, colloquially pronounced "Sin-Widdy") reveals the theory of operation or design of the components of a nuclear weapon. As such, it would be SIGMA 1 or SIGMA 2 material, assuming laser fusion is not involved in the information.

Access to CNWDI is supposed to be kept to the minimum number of individuals needed. In written documents, paragraphs containing the material, assuming it is Top Secret, would be marked (TS//RD-CNWDI). SIGMA information of special sensitivity may be handled much like SAP or SCI material (q.v.)

Naval Nuclear Propulsion Information
While most Naval Nuclear Propulsion Information is sensitive, it may or may not be classified. The desired power densities of naval reactors make their design peculiar to military use, specifically high-displacement, high-speed vessels. The proliferation of quieter- or higher-performance marine propulsion systems presents a national-security threat to the United States. Due to this fact, all but the most basic information concerning NNPI is classified. The United States Navy recognizes that the public has an interest in environmental, safety, and health information, and that the basic research the Navy carries out can be useful to industry.

Sharing of classified information with other countries
In cases where the United States wishes to share classified information bilaterally (or multilaterally) with a country that has a sharing agreement, the information is marked with "REL TO USA", (release) and the three-letter country code. For example, if the U.S. wanted to release classified information to the government of Canada, it would mark the document "REL TO USA, CAN". There are also group releases, such as NATO, FVEY or UKUSA. Those countries would have to maintain the classification of the document at the level originally classified (Top Secret, Secret, etc.).

Claims of U.S. government misuse of the classification system

Max Weber:

Every bureaucracy strives to increase the superiority of its position by keeping its knowledge and intentions secret. Bureaucratic administration always seeks to evade the light of the public as best it can, because in so doing it shields its knowledge and conduct from criticism ...

While the classification of information by the government is not supposed to be used to prevent information from being made public that would be simply embarrassing or reveal criminal acts, it has been alleged that the government routinely misuses the classification system to cover up criminal activity and potentially embarrassing discoveries.

Steven Aftergood, director of the Project on Government Secrecy at the Federation of American Scientists notes that

... inquiring into classified government information and disclosing it is something that many national security reporters and policy analysts do, or try to do, every day. And with a few narrow exceptions—for particularly sensitive types of information—courts have determined that this is not a crime." Aftergood notes, "The universe of classified information includes not only genuine national security secrets, such as confidential intelligence sources or advanced military technologies, but an endless supply of mundane bureaucratic trivia, such as 50-year-old intelligence budget figures, as well as the occasional crime or cover-up.

As early as 1956, the U.S. Department of Defense estimated that 90% of its classified documents could be publicly disclosed with no harm to national security. The National Security Archive has collected a number of examples of overclassification and government censors blacking out documents that have already been released in full, or redacting entirely different parts of the same document at different times.

In The Pentagon Papers case, a classified study was published revealing that four administrations had misled the American public about their intentions in the Vietnam War, increasing the credibility gap. Tony Russo and Daniel Ellsberg were prosecuted under espionage law. The case prompted Harold Edgar & Benno C. Schmidt, Jr. to write a review of espionage law in the 1973 Columbia Law Review. Their article was entitled "The Espionage Statutes and Publication of Defense Information". In it, they point out that espionage law does not criminalize classified information, only national defense information. They point out that Congress has repeatedly resisted or failed to make the disclosing of classified information illegal, in and of itself. Instead, Congress has strictly limited which sort of classified information is illegal, and under which specific circumstances it is illegal. i.e. in  Congress specifically criminalized leaking cryptographic information that is classified, but when it passed the law it specifically stated the law didn't criminalize disclosing other types of classified information. Another article that discusses the issue is by Jennifer Elsea of the Congressional Research Service.

Various UFO conspiracies mention a level "Above Top Secret" used for UFO design information and related data. They suggest such a classification is intended to apply to information relating to things whose possible existence is to be denied, such as aliens, as opposed to things whose potential existence may be recognized, but for which access to information regarding specific programs would be denied as classified. The British government, for example, denied for several decades that they were either involved or interested in UFO sightings. However, in 2008, the government revealed they have monitored UFO activity for at least the past 30 years.

The existence of an "Above Top Secret" classification is considered by some as unnecessary to keep the existence of aliens a secret, as they say information at the Top Secret level, or any level for that matter, can be restricted on the basis of need to know. Thus, the U.S. government could conceal an alien project without having to resort to another level of clearance, as need to know would limit the ability to have access to the information. Some suggest that claims of the existence of such a classification level may be based on the unsubstantiated belief that the levels of classification are themselves classified. As such, they feel that books claiming to contain "Above Top Secret" information on UFOs or remote viewing should arguably be taken with a grain of salt.

Without making a judgment on if such classifications have been used for space aliens, it is a reality that even the names of some compartments were classified, and certainly the meaning of the code names. In the cited document, an (S) means the material it precedes is Secret and (TS) means Top Secret. According to the Department of Defense directive, "the fact of" the existence of NRO was at the secret level for many years, as well as the fact of and the actual phrase "National Reconnaissance Program" (see Paragraph II). Paragraph V(a) is largely redacted, but the introduction
to the documents clarifies (see Document 19) that it refers to the now-cancelled BYEMAN code word and control channel for NRO activities. BYEMAN, the main NRO compartment, was classified as a full word, although the special security offices could refer, in an unclassified way, to "B policy".

Responsible agencies

Any agency designated by the President can originate classified information if it meets the content criteria. Each agency is responsible for safeguarding and declassifying its own documents. The National Archives and Records Administration (NARA) has custody of classified documents from defunct agencies, and also houses the National Declassification Center (since 2010) and Information Security Oversight Office. The Interagency Security Classification Appeals Panel has representatives from the United States Department of State, United States Departmen of Justice; the National Archives, the Office of the Director of National Intelligence (OFAC); the National Security Advisor (NSA); the Central Intelligence Agency (CIA); and Information Security Oversight Office.

Declassification

Declassification is the process of removing the classification of a document and opening it for public inspection.

Automatic declassification
In accordance with Executive Order 13526, published January 5, 2010 (which superseded Executive Order 12958, as amended), an executive agency must declassify its documents after 25 years unless they fall under one of the nine narrow exemptions outlined by section 3.3 of the order. Classified documents 25 years or older must be reviewed by any and all agencies that possess an interest in the sensitive information found in the document. Documents classified for longer than 50 years must concern human intelligence sources or weapons of mass destruction, or get special permission. All documents older than 75 years must have special permission.

Systematic declassification
The Order also requires that agencies establish and conduct a program for systematic declassification review, based on the new and narrower criteria. This only applies to records that are of permanent historical value and less than 25 years old. Section 3.4 of Order 13526, directs agencies to prioritize the systematic review of records based upon the degree of researcher interest and the likelihood of declassification upon review.

Mandatory Declassification Review
A Mandatory Declassification Review, or MDR, is requested by an individual in an attempt to declassify a document for release to the public. These challenges are presented to the agency whose equity, or "ownership", is invested in the document. Once an MDR request has been submitted to an agency for the review of a particular document, the agency must respond either with an approval, a denial, or the inability to confirm or deny the existence or nonexistence of the requested document.

After the initial request, an appeal can be filed with the agency by the requester. If the agency refuses to declassify that document, then a decision from a higher authority can be provided by the appellate panel, the Interagency Security Classification Appeals Panel (ISCAP).

Freedom of Information Act

The U.S. Freedom of Information Act (FOIA) was signed into law by President Lyndon B. Johnson on July 4, 1966, took effect the following year, and was amended in 1974, 1976, 1986, 1996 and 2002 (in 1974 over President Ford's veto). This act allows for the full or partial disclosure of previously unreleased information and documents controlled by the U.S. government. Any member of the public may ask for a classified document to be declassified and made available for any reason.

The requestor is required to specify with reasonable certainty the documents of interest. If the agency refuses to declassify, the decision can be taken to the courts for a review. The FOIA does not guarantee that requested documents will be released. Refusals usually fall under one of the nine of the declassification exemptions that protect highly sensitive information.

History of National Archives and Records Administration role

After declassification, the documents from many agencies are accessioned at the National Archives and Records Administration and put on the open shelves for the public. NARA also reviews documents for declassification.

NARA first established a formal declassification program for records in 1972, and between 1973 and 1996 reviewed nearly 650 million pages of historically valuable federal records related to World War II, the Korean War, and American foreign policy in the 1950s as part of its systematic declassification review program. From 1996 to 2006, NARA had processed and released close to 460 million pages of federal records, working in partnership with the agencies that originated the records. Over the years, NARA has processed more than 1.1 billion pages of national security classified federal records, resulting in the declassification and release of ninety-one percent of the records.

NARA has also provided significant support to several special projects to review and release federal records on topics of extraordinary public interest such as POW/MIAs or Nazi war crimes. Additionally, NARA works closely with reference archivists to ensure that the federal records most in demand by researchers receive priority for declassification review and performs review on demand for individuals who need records that do not fall into a priority category. NARA has improved or developed electronic systems to support declassification, automating some processes and thus ensuring a more complete record of declassification actions. With assistance from the Air Force, NARA established the Interagency Referral Center (IRC) in order to support agencies as they seek access to their equities in federal records at the National Archives at College Park and to ensure that high-demand records are processed first.

In 2009, Executive Order 13526 created the National Declassification Center at NARA, which also houses the Information Security Oversight Office.

Presidential libraries

Presidential libraries hold in excess of 30 million classified pages, including approximately 8 million pages from the administrations of Presidents Hoover through Carter, that were subject to automatic declassification on December 31, 2006. The foreign policy materials in Presidential collections are among the highest-level foreign policy documents in the Federal government and are of significant historical value.

From 1995 to 2006, the national presidential library system reviewed, declassified, and released 1,603,429 pages of presidential materials using systematic guidelines delegated to the Archivist of the United States. NARA has also hosted on-site agency review teams at the Eisenhower, Kennedy, and Ford Presidential Libraries to manage classified equities and all presidential libraries have robust mandatory declassification review programs to support requests of individual researchers.

See also
 Controlled Cryptographic Item
 Copyright status of work by the U.S. government
 Espionage Act of 1917
 Invention Secrecy Act
 List of U.S. security clearance terms
 McCollum memo
 Q clearance
 Secrecy News, a newsletter that covers U.S. classification policy
 Sensitive Compartmented Information
 Sensitive Security Information, generally transportation security information such as airport passenger screening or commercial aircraft security
 United States diplomatic cables leak, the leak by Chelsea Manning via WikiLeaks
 United States v. Reynolds

References

Citations

General and cited sources 
 Information Security Oversight Office (ISOO), a component of the National Archives and Records Administration (NARA)
 Policy Docs at ISOO, includes Executive Order 13526 – Classified National Security Information
 Memorandum of December 29, 2009 – Implementation of Executive Order 13526,
 Order of December 29, 2009 – Original Classification Authority
 Implementing Directive; Final Rule ( 32 C.F.R. Part 2001) ← rest of E.O. 13526 came into full effect June 25, 2010
 Executive Order 12333, text at WikiSource
 Executive Order 13292, text at WikiSource
 Security Classified and Controlled Information: History, Status, and Emerging Management Issues, Congressional Research Service, January 2, 2008
 DoD 5220.22-M National Industrial Security Program Operating Manual (NISPOM)
 400 Series DOE Directives by Number The 400 series of directives is where DOE keeps most security and classification-related items.
 Atomic Energy Act of 1954 42 USC 2168 – The Atomic Energy Act of 1954 at the US Nuclear Regulatory Commission
 Espionage Act 18 USC 793, 794, 798
 Designation and Sharing of Controlled Unclassified Information (CUI) – Presidential Memo of May 7, 2008
 National Declassification Center

Further reading

External links
 Explanation of the US Classification System
 Public Interest Declassification Board
 Department of Justice - Freedom of Information Act
 US Department of Defense - Freedom of Information Act
 The National Security Archive
 Open the Government.org
 Federation of American Scientists
 Declassified Documents from UCB Libraries GovPubs
 Criminal Prohibitions on Leaks and Other Disclosures of Classified Defense Information, Stephen P. Mulligan and Jennifer K. Elsea, Congressional Research Service, March 7, 2017.
 The Protection of Classified Information: The Legal Framework, Jennifer K. Elsea, Congressional Research Service, May 18, 2017.

 
United States government information

fr:Information classée secrète#États-Unis d'Amérique